The women's 63 kilograms (half middleweight) competition at the 2006 Asian Games in Doha was held on 3 December at the Qatar SC Indoor Hall.

Schedule
All times are Arabia Standard Time (UTC+03:00)

Results

Main bracket

Repechage

References

Results

External links
 
 Official website

W63
Judo at the Asian Games Women's Half Middleweight
Asian W63